Ovechkin (from овечка meaning little sheep) is a Russian masculine surname, its feminine counterpart is Ovechkina. People with the name include:

People
Alexander Ovechkin (born 1985), Russian professional ice hockey winger 
Artem Ovechkin (born 1986), Russian road bicycle racer
Mariya Ovechkina (born 1991), Russian beauty pageant contestant
Nadezhda Ovechkina (born 1958), Russian field hockey player
Tatyana Ovechkina (born 1950), Russian basketball player
Valentin Ovechkin (1904–1968), Soviet writer, playwright, and journalist

Fictional characters
 Captain Ovechkin, an antagonist in Keosayan's Elusive Avengers film series who first appeared in The New Adventures of the Elusive Avengers

See also
 The Ovechkin family which hijacked Aeroflot Flight 3739 (1988) in a failed attempt to escape the Soviet Union

257261 Ovechkin, an asteroid named for Alexander Ovechkin

References

Russian-language surnames